Damijan Šinigoj (born 1964 in Novo Mesto) is a Slovene writer, translator, editor, publicist and scriptwriter. He is a member of Slovene Writers' Association, Slovene Translators' Association, Chief editor at Novo mesto Magazine, chief editor at Jamar Magazine, chief editor at Naše jame Magazine. Columnist at MAMA magazine and many others.

He wrote four novels, They Shoot The Soldiers, Don't They? (Amalietti, Ljubljana, 1991) and Unfired Rounds (Amalietti & Slon, Ljubljana, 1994), "Looking for Eve" (Miš, Domžale, 2014), "Where the wind sleeps (Miš, Domžale, 2020)" and three collections of short stories Father's Cosy Nook (GOGA, Novo Mesto, 2003), “Short Diary of a Cave Addict” (GOGA, Novo mesto, 2012) and "The third child" (Novellish, Ljubljana, 2020). In 2000 he translated the novel Short Trip by Ratko Cvetnić from Croatian, in 2001 the novel Witness by Zilhad Ključanin from Bosnian, in 2003 the novel Surfacing by Veselin Marković from Serbian, and in 2006 Things I Kept Inside Me'' by Aleksandra Kardum from Croatian "End of the Century, Beginning of the Millennium", an anthology of Bosnian short story from Bosnian, "The girl on the road" by Goran Samardzic from Bosnian, "Ukulele jam" by Alan Mešković from Croatian. After his script in 2002 a documentary film “When The War Knocks” was filmed and a feature film »1991 – Unfired rounds« was made.
The novel Unfired Rounds is the first major literary work about the war in Slovenia in 1991, which is neither a eulogy nor a heroic picture of the now already recent history. In it, the author presents a multi-layered truth with a strong anti-war philosophy. It is a collective novel which focuses on the war as a powerful and rational mechanism that destroys everything in its path and puts individuals on a test.

He is also a caver, caving instructor and instructor of cave rescueing, vice president of Caving Association of Slovenia and head of Education of Cave Rescue Service of Slovenia. Also a member of CaveSAR unit, Cave Rescue Unit at EU Civil Protection.

Avards:
Trdinova nagrada za literaturo 2010
Rastem s knjigo 2015 za roman Iskanje Eve
Nominacija za Večernico 2015, za najboljše mladinsko delo za roman Iskanje Eve
Nominacija za Desetnico 2015, za najboljšo mladinsko književnost za roman Iskanje Eve
Zlata hruška 2021 za roman Iskanje Eve
Zlata hruška za najboljši prevod leta 2015 za roman Ukulele jam Alena Meškovića
Nominacija za Večernico 2021, za najboljše mladinsko delo za roman Kjer veter spi
Desetnica 2021, za najboljšo mladinsko književnost za roman Kjer veter spi
Zlata hruška 2021 za roman Kjer veter spi
The White Ravens za roman Kjer veter spi

External links
 Official site

Slovenian novelists
Slovenian male short story writers
Slovenian short story writers
Slovenian translators
Serbian–Slovene translators
Croatian–Slovene translators
Print editors
Slovenian screenwriters
Male screenwriters
1964 births
Living people
Writers from Novo Mesto